Phool.co is an Indian biomaterials startup co-founded by Ankit Agarwal and Prateek Kumar in 2017 to collect temple flower waste dumped in rivers in Kanpur. It use flowers from temples across India's and create useful products such as rose incense cone, Phool vermicompost. Phool is a brand owned by Kanpur Flowercyling Pvt. Ltd founded in 2017, till now 11,060 metric tonnes of temple waste is recycled. The company has recently been split into the companies HelpUsGreen and Phool.

History 
An idea of recycling flowers started when Ankit Agarwal and Prateek Kumar visited Ghats of River Ganga and realized the danger of temple flowers containing pesticides and insecticides. They planned to meet temple waste management and pitch their idea of recycling flowers. After a year and half of research product like incense cone and vermicompost started.

Products 
Florafoam is a product which is completely decomposable in environment after its use and purely made of flowers. It is alternative to thermacol which takes years to decompose. Florafoam chosen in Amazon stores India.

Accolades 

 The 2018 World Changing Idea.
 Unilever Young Entrepreneur Award.
 Sprit of Manufacturing Awards.

References

External links 
 PHOOL.Co

|

Recycling industry